Greh njene majke (The sin of her mother) is a Serbian television series filmed in 2009 based on the novel by Mir-Jam.  It has been shown at Radio Television of Serbia from 20 November 2009 to 12 March 2010. The series is set in the time before the Second World War in Serbia. The series follows Neda, a young girl who remained tragically orphaned. Alone in the world, she begins to fight for a place in society and life trying to figure out what was her mother once did and why she has to pay her "sin".

Roles

External links

References 

Serbian drama television series
Television shows set in Serbia
Television shows filmed in Serbia
Radio Television of Serbia original programming